The 1980–81 Vanderbilt Commodores men's basketball team represented Vanderbilt University as a member of the Southeastern Conference during the 1980–81 college basketball season. The Commodores finished season with record of 15-14, 7-11.

Roster
The roster for the 80-81 team are as follows:

1. Al Miller

2. Charles Davis 

3. Mike Rhodes 

4. Hutch Jones 

5. Ted Young 

6. Jimmy Gray 

7. Al McKinney 

8. Brian Allsmiller 

9. Jeff Turner 

10. Jimmy Lenz 

11. Kevin Linder 

12. John Derenbecker 

13. James Williams 

14. Doug Weikert

Schedule
The 80-81 schedule is as follows:

|-
!colspan=9 style=| SEC Tournament

References 

Vanderbilt
Vanderbilt Commodores basketball
Vanderbilt Commodores men's basketball
Vanderbilt Commodores men's basketball seasons